Stéphane Praxis Rabemananjara (born September 9, 1983 in Madagascar) is a Malagasy football striker currently playing for Saint-Denis FC.  He is a member of the Madagascar national football team.

International career

International goals

Scores and results list Madagascar's goal tally first.

Honours

Club
Leopards Transfoot Toamasina
 Coupe de Madagascar (1) : 2003

Pamplemousses SC
 Mauritian League (1) : 2006
 Mauritian Cup (1) : 2006

Individual

Pamplemousses SC
Top scorer Mauritian League (4) : 2004, 2005, 2006, 2007

Saint-Denis FC
Top scorer Réunion Premier League (1) : 2010

References

External links 

1987 births
Living people
Malagasy footballers
Madagascar international footballers
Association football forwards
Expatriate footballers in Mauritius
Pamplemousses SC players
Expatriate footballers in Réunion
Malagasy expatriate sportspeople in Réunion
Malagasy expatriate sportspeople in Mauritius